Booko is a town in north-western Ivory Coast. It is a sub-prefecture and commune of Koro Department in Bafing Region, Woroba District.

In 2014, the population of the sub-prefecture of Booko was 18,356.

Villages
The forty five villages of the sub-prefecture of Booko and their population in 2014 are:

Notes

Sub-prefectures of Bafing Region
Communes of Bafing Region